The 2010 E3 Prijs Vlaanderen was the 53rd edition of the E3 Harelbeke cycle race and was held on 27 March 2010. The race started and finished in Harelbeke.

General classification

References

Further reading

2010 in Belgian sport
2010